Babo may refer to:

People
 Babo, a nickname for Fikret Abdić (born 1939), Bosnian politician
 Alberto Babo (born 1947), head coach of Porto Ferpinta, Portugal
 Joseph Marius Babo (1756–1822), German dramatist
 Lambert Heinrich von Babo (1818–1899), German chemist

Other
Babo Airport West Papua, Indonesia
Babo, unfilmed 1969 film script by Pablo Neruda based on Babo, Senegalese servant in the short novel Benito Cereno
 BABO, a 2008 South Korean film
 Babo (2019 film), an Indian Marathi-language film
 Babo, an Uglydolls character
 Babo 73, 1964 film by Robert Downey Sr.

See also
 Babos, a Hungarian surname

German-language surnames